Federico Pereyra (born 19 June 1988) is an Argentine volleyball player. He competed in the men's tournament at the 2012 Summer Olympics.

References

External links
 

1988 births
Living people
Argentine men's volleyball players
Olympic volleyball players of Argentina
Volleyball players at the 2012 Summer Olympics
People from San Juan, Argentina
Volleyball players at the 2011 Pan American Games
Pan American Games bronze medalists for Argentina
Pan American Games medalists in volleyball
Medalists at the 2011 Pan American Games
Volleyball players at the 2020 Summer Olympics
Medalists at the 2020 Summer Olympics
Olympic bronze medalists for Argentina
Olympic medalists in volleyball
Sportspeople from San Juan Province, Argentina